The Reverse Underground Railroad is the name given, sardonically, to the pre-American Civil War practice of kidnapping in free states not only fugitive slaves but free blacks as well, transporting them to slave states, and selling them as slaves, or occasionally getting a reward for return of a fugitive. Those who used the term were pro-slavery and angered at an "underground railroad" helping slaves escape. Also, the so-called "reverse underground railroad" had incidents but not a network, and its activities did not always take place in secret. Rescues of blacks being kidnapped were unusual.

Three types of kidnapping methods were employed: physical abduction, inveiglement (kidnapping through trickery) of free blacks, and apprehension of fugitives. The Reverse Underground Railroad operated for 85 years, from 1780 to 1865.  The name is a reference to the Underground Railroad, the informal network of abolitionists and sympathizers who helped smuggle escaped slaves to freedom, generally in Canada but also in Mexico where slavery had been abolished.

Prevalence
Free African Americans were often kidnapped from the southernmost free states, along the borders of the slave states of Delaware, Maryland, Kentucky, and Missouri, but kidnapping was also prevalent in states further north, such as New York, Pennsylvania, and Illinois, as well as in abolition-minded regions of some Southern states, such as Tennessee.

New York and Pennsylvania
Free blacks in New York City and Philadelphia were particularly vulnerable to kidnapping.  In New York, a gang known as 'the black-birders' regularly waylaid men, women and children, sometimes with the support and participation of policemen and city officials.  In Philadelphia, black newspapers frequently ran missing children notices, including one for the 14-year-old daughter of the newspaper's editor.  Children were particularly susceptible to kidnapping;  in a two-year period, at least a hundred children were abducted in Philadelphia alone.

Delaware, Maryland, and Virginia
From 1811 to 1829, Martha "Patty" Cannon was the leader of a gang that kidnapped slaves and free blacks, from the Delmarva Peninsula of Delaware, Maryland, Virginia, and Chesapeake Bay and transported and sold them to plantation owners located further south. She was indicted for four murders in 1829 and died in prison, while awaiting trial, purportedly a suicide via arsenic poisoning.

Illinois
John Hart Crenshaw was a large landowner, salt maker, and slave trader, from the 1820s to the 1850s, based out of the southeastern part of Illinois in Gallatin County and a business associate of Kentucky lawman and outlaw, James Ford. Crenshaw and Ford were allegedly kidnapping free blacks in southeastern Illinois and selling them in the slave state of Kentucky. Although Illinois was a free state, Crenshaw leased the salt works in nearby Equality, Illinois from the U.S. Government, which permitted the use of slaves for the arduous labor of hauling and boiling salt brine water from local salt springs to produce salt. Due to Crenshaw's keeping and "breeding" of slaves and kidnapping of free blacks, who were then pressed into slavery, his house became popularly known as The Old Slave House.

Other cases of the Reverse Underground Railroad in Illinois occurred in the southwestern and western parts of the state, along the Mississippi River bordering the slave state of Missouri. In 1860, John and Nancy Curtis were arrested for trying to kidnap their own freed slaves in Johnson County, Illinois to sell back into slavery in Missouri. Free blacks were also kidnapped in Jersey County, Illinois and taken away to be sold as slaves in Missouri.

Southern states
Black sailors who voyaged to southern states faced the threat of kidnapping. South Carolina passed the Negro Seamen Act in 1822 out of fear that free black sailors would inspire slave revolts, requiring that they be incarcerated while their ship was docked. This could lead to black sailors being sold into slavery if their captains did not pay fees resulting from them being jailed, or if their freedom papers were lost.

In the 1820s–1830s, John A. Murrell led an outlaw gang in western Tennessee. He was once caught with a freed slave living on his property. His tactics were to kidnap slaves from their plantations, promise them their freedom, and instead sell them back to other slave owners. If Murrell was in danger of being caught with kidnapped slaves, he would kill the slaves to escape being arrested with stolen property, which was considered a major crime in the Southern United States. In 1834, Murrell was arrested and sentenced to ten years in the Tennessee State Penitentiary in Nashville for slave-stealing.

Routes

The 1827 newspaper The African Observer described how several Philadelphia children were lured on board a small sloop, at anchor in the Delaware River, with the promise of peaches, oranges and watermelons, then immediately put into the hold of the ship in chains, where they took a week long journey by ship. Once landed, they were marched through brushwood, swamp and cornfields to the home of Joe Johnson and Jesse and Patty Cannon, on the line between Delaware and Maryland, where they were 'kept in irons for a considerable amount of time.' From there, they were again put on board another vessel for a week or more, where one of the children heard someone talking about Chesapeake Bay, in Maryland. Once landed, they were marched again for 'many hundred miles' through Alabama until they reached Rocky Springs, Mississippi.

The same article described a chain of Reverse Underground Railroad posts "established from Pennsylvania to Louisiana."

In the West, kidnappers rode the waters of the Ohio River, stealing slaves in Kentucky and kidnapping free people in Southern Ohio, Indiana and Illinois, who were then transported to the slave states.

Travel conditions
Many kidnapped black people were marched to the South on foot. The men were chained together to prevent escape, while the women and children tended to be less restricted.

Prevention and rescue

As early as 1775, Anthony Benezet and others met in Philadelphia and organized the 
Society for the Relief of Free Negroes Unlawfully held in Bondage to focus on intervention in the cases of blacks and Indians who claimed to have been illegally enslaved. This group was later reorganized as the biracial Pennsylvania Abolition Society. The Protecting Society of Philadelphia, an auxiliary of the Pennsylvania Abolition Society,  was established in 1827 for "the prevention of kidnapping and man-stealing". In January, 1837, The New York Vigilance Committee, established because any free black person was at risk for being kidnapped, reported that it had protected 335 persons from slavery. David A. Ruggles, a black newspaper editor and treasurer of the organization, writes in his paper of his futile attempts to convince two New York judges to prevent illegal kidnapping, as well as a daring successful physical rescue of a young girl named Charity Walker from the New York home of her captors.

State and city governments had difficulty in preventing kidnappings, even before the Fugitive Slave Act of 1850. The Pennsylvania Abolition Society compared records of apprehended blacks to try to free those who were wrongfully detained, kept a list of missing people who were potential abductees, and formed the Committee on Kidnapping. However, these efforts proved to be expensive, rendering them unable to work effectively due to their lack of sustainability.

Citizens, particularly free black citizens, were active in lobbying local governments to adopt stronger measures against kidnapping. In 1800, Richard Allen and Absalom Jones sent a petition to Congress from 73 prominent free Black citizens urging a stop to the kidnappings.  It was ignored. Due to the lack of effectiveness from government institutions, free blacks were frequently forced to use their own methods to protect themselves and their families. Such methods included keeping proof of their freedom with them at all times and avoiding contact with strangers as well as certain areas. Vigilante groups were also formed to attack kidnappers, including black kidnappers, the latter of whom were universally condemned by the free African-American community.

From Philadelphia, high constable Samuel Parker Garrigues took several trips to Southern states at the behest of mayor Joseph Watson to rescue children and adults who had been kidnapped from the city's streets. He also successfully went after their abductors. One such case was Charles Bailey, kidnapped at fourteen in 1825 and finally rescued by Garrigues after a three-year search. Unfortunately, the beaten and emaciated youth died a few days after being brought back to Philadelphia. Garrigues was able to find and arrest Bailey's abductor, Captain John Smith, alias Thomas Collins, head of "The Johnson Gang". He also tracked down and arrested John Purnell of the Patty Cannon gang. Watson publicized the hunt for the kidnappers in several newspapers, offering a $500 reward. On one occasion,  a courageous 15 year old Black boy named Sam Scomp spoke out about his kidnapping during his attempted sale to a white southern planter named John Hamilton.   The planter himself contacted Mayor Watson to arrange a rescue of the boy and another kidnapped youth.

In popular culture
In 1853, Solomon Northrup published Twelve Years A Slave, a memoir of his kidnapping from New York and twelve years spent as a slave in Louisiana. His book sold 30,000 copies upon release.  His narrative was made into a 2013 film, which won three Academy Awards. Comfort: A Novel of the Reverse Underground Railroad by H. A. Maxson and Claudia H. Young, came out in 2014.

Abolitionist publications frequently used accounts of people who were kidnapped into slavery for their publications. Notable works that published these accounts include The African Observer, a monthly publication that used firsthand accounts to demonstrate the evils of slavery, as well as Isaac Hopper's Tales of Oppression, a compilation by the abolitionist Isaac Hopper of kidnapping accounts.

Notable illegal slave trader kidnappers and illegal slave breeders
 Patty Cannon and Cannon-Johnson Gang
 John Hart Crenshaw
 John A. Murrell

Notable victims
 Solomon Northup
 Cornelius Sinclair

Gallery

See also
 Black Codes (United States)
 Fugitive Slave Act of 1850
 Judicial aspects of race in the United States
 Jim Crow laws
 Delphine LaLaurie
 Solomon Northup
 Racial segregation in the United States
 Slave catcher
 Slave codes
 Sundown town
 Slavery in the United States
 Underground Railroad

References

Berry, Daina Ramey.  The Price for Their Pound of Flesh: The Value of the Enslaved from Womb to Grave in the Building of a Nation.  Boston, MA:  Beacon Press, 2017.
Blackmore, Jacqueline.  African American and Race Relations in Gallatin County, Illinois:  from the 18th century to 1870.  Ann Arbor: Proquest, 1996.
Campbell, Stanley W.  The Slave Catchers: Enforcement of the Fugitive Slave Law, 1850–1860. Chapel Hill, NC:  University of North Carolina Press Books, 2012. 
Collins, Winfield Hazlitt.  The domestic slave trade of the southern states.  Broadway Publishing Company, 1904.
Diggins, Milt. Stealing Freedom Along the Mason–Dixon Line: Thomas McCreary, the Notorious Slave Catcher from Maryland.  Baltimore, MD:  Johns Hopkins University Press, 2015.
Fiske, David.  Solomon Northup's Kindred: The Kidnapping of Free Citizens before the Civil War: The Kidnapping of Free Citizens before the Civil War.  Santa Barbara, CA:  ABC-CLIO, 2016. 
Fiske, David, Clifford W Brown Jr., and Rachel Seligman. Solomon Northup: The Complete Story of the Author of Twelve Years A Slave:  The Complete Story of the Author of Twelve Years a Slave.  Santa Barbara, CA:  ABC-CLIO, 2013
Giles, Ted.  Patty Cannon: Woman of Mystery.  Easton Publishing Company, 1965. 
Harrold, Stanley.  Border War: Fighting over Slavery before the Civil War.  Chapel Hill, NC:  University of North Carolina Press, 2010.
Maddox, Lucy. The Parker Sisters: A Border Kidnapping.  Philadelphia, PA:  Temple University Press, 2016. 
Morgan, Michael. Delmarva's Patty Cannon: The Devil on the Nanticoke.  Charleston, SC: History Press, 2015.
Musgrave, Jon.  Slaves, Salt, Sex and Mr. Crenshaw: The Real Story of the Old Slave House and America's Reverse Underground R. R.  IllinoisHistory.com, 2004.
Musgrave, Jon.  "Black Kidnappings in the Wabash and Ohio Valleys of Illinois".  Research Paper presented at Dr. John Y. Simon's Seminar in Illinois History at Southern Illinois University at Carbondale, April–May 1997, Carbondale, IL.
Musgrave, Jon.  Potts Hill Gang, Sturdivant Gang, and Ford's Ferry Gang Rogue's Gallery, Hardin County in IllinoisGenWeb.  Springfield, IL:  The Illinois Gen Web Project, 2018.
Penick, James L.  The great western land pirate: John A. Murrell in legend and history.  Columbia, MO: University of Missouri Press, 1981.
Phares, Ross.  Reverend Devil: Master Criminal of the Old South.  Gretna, LA:  Publisher Pelican Publishing, 1941.
Slaughter, Thomas P.  Bloody Dawn: The Christiana Riot and Racial Violence in the Antebellum North.  Oxford, UK:  Oxford University Press, 1994. 
Stewart, Virgil A.  The history of Virgil A. Stewart: and his adventure in capturing and exposing the great "western land pirate" and his gang...  New York, NY: Harper and Brothers, 1836.
Wellman, Paul L.  Spawn of Evil.  New York, NY:  Doubleday and Company, 1964.
Wilson, Carol.  Freedom at Risk:  The Kidnapping of Free Blacks in America, 1780–1865. Lexington, KY: University Press of Kentucky, 1994.

External links
"Reverse Underground Railroad' Is Touted For Preservation," Chicago Tribune
"Black Kidnappings in the Wabash and Ohio Valleys of Illinois" by Jon Musgrave
Reverse Underground Railroad in Illinois – A Myth of a Free State
Kidnapping, PBS Documentary

Slavery in the United States
Underground Railroad